John Klein is a retired American soccer midfielder who played professionally in the American Professional Soccer League, Major Indoor Soccer League and National Professional Soccer League.  He currently coaches the Columbia College men's and women's soccer teams.

Player
Klein graduated from Saint Louis Priory School in 1983.  In 1983, Klein began his collegiate career with the Duke Blue Devils.  He then transferred to Saint Louis University after the 1984 season where he finished his college career.  He was inducted into the Saint Louis Billikens Athletic Hall of Fame in 1995.

In 1987, Klein played for the independent F.C. Washington.  Klein also played for St. Louis Kutis.  In October 1989, Klein signed with the St. Louis Storm of the Major Indoor Soccer League.  He played four games before being moved to the developmental squad in December.  When Klein refused to move to the developmental squad, the Storm released him.  In the summer of 1990, Klein played for the Colorado Foxes of the American Professional Soccer League.  That fall, he signed with the Kansas City Comets of MISL where he played the 1990–1991 indoor season.  In October 1991, he returned to the Storm.  In the summer of 1992, he played for the Miami Freedom.  In 1992, he joined the St. Louis Ambush of the National Professional Soccer League.

Klein is a member of the St. Louis Soccer Hall of Fame.

Coach
On February 11, 2000, Columbia College hired Klein as head coach of the men's soccer team.

Personal
Klein has 3 children, John, Molly, and Emily. John Klein III played on the Saint Louis Billikens men's soccer team and was drafted by the Kansas City Comets in the 2022 Major Arena Soccer League College Draft. Molly played for Klein's Columbia College women's team from 2016 to 2019, and has also coached alongside her father at Columbia College as a graduate assistant.

References

External links
 MISL stats
 Columbia College coaching profile

1965 births
Living people
American soccer coaches
American soccer players
American Professional Soccer League players
Colorado Foxes players
Duke Blue Devils men's soccer players
Kansas City Comets (original MISL) players
Major Indoor Soccer League (1978–1992) players
Miami Freedom players
National Professional Soccer League (1984–2001) players
Saint Louis Billikens men's soccer players
Soccer players from St. Louis
St. Louis Ambush (1992–2000) players
St. Louis Kutis players
St. Louis Storm players
Alumni of Le Cordon Bleu
Association football midfielders
Columbia College (Missouri) faculty
College men's soccer coaches in the United States
College women's soccer coaches in the United States